Cardiestra is a genus of moths of the family Noctuidae.

Species include:
    * Cardiestra eremistis (Püngeler 1904)
    * Cardiestra gobideserti (Varga 1973)
    * Cardiestra vaciva (Püngeler 1906)
    * Cardiestra vasilinini (Bang-Haas 1927)

References
Natural History Museum Lepidoptera genus database

Hadeninae